The 3rd Health Support Battalion (3 HSB) is an Australian Army Reserve unit headquartered in Adelaide, South Australia, with sub-units spread across Victoria, Tasmania, South Australia, New South Wales and Queensland. Drawing its lineage from the 3rd Australian General Hospital, which was raised for service during World War I, the unit is tasked with providing Role 2 health support to troops deployed overseas on operations and within Australia on exercise, and has provided medical personnel for a variety deployments in the post-war period, including those to Rwanda, Bougainville, East Timor, Iraq and Afghanistan.

Structure and role
Consisting of four health support companies – the 1st, 2nd, 3rd and 6th – the unit is headquartered at Keswick Barracks in Adelaide with sub-units and elements in Melbourne, Hobart, Sydney and Adelaide. The unit forms part of the 17th Sustainment Brigade. 

While it is designated primarily as a Reserve unit, 3 HSB has a small cadre of Regular Army personnel who are tasked with administration and training. Personnel belong to a variety of corps, including the Royal Australian Army Medical Corps, the Royal Australian Army Nursing Corps, the Royal Australian Army Dental Corps, and other logistical corps. It is generally used to provide individual reinforcements to the Army’s other two health battalions – the 1st Close and 2nd General Health Battalions – and is tasked with providing health support at Role 2 and above, including initial wound and definitive surgical interventions, and maintains the majority of the Australian Army’s high level surgical capabilities.

History
The unit traces its lineage back to the 3rd Australian General Hospital (3 AGH) that was established during the early years of World War I. During the Gallipoli Campaign, 3 AGH served on Lemnos Island before moving to Egypt in January 1916, having treated 7,400 patients. In mid-1916, the unit moved to Brighton in the United Kingdom as part of the transfer of the Australian Imperial Force to the Western Front. It was later moved across the English Channel to France, where it was established around Abbeville, remaining there until it was demobilised in 1919. 

In the post-war period, the unit has deployed personnel on various overseas deployments, mostly through rounding out Regular medical units. It provided individual personnel to deployments to Vietnam, Rwanda, Bougainville, Iraq and Afghanistan and provided the majority of the personnel assigned to the fourth rotation of the UNMILHOSP force sent to East Timor in 2001.

References

Citations

Bibliography
 

Combat service support battalions of the Australian Army
Army medical units and formations of Australia
Medical battalions